The Girard Avenue Historic District is a national historic district which is located in the Cabot neighborhood of Philadelphia, Pennsylvania. 

It was added to the National Register of Historic Places in 1985.

History and architectural features
This district encompasses one hundred and thirty-seven contributing buildings, which were largely built during the mid- to late-19th century and consisted of residential, commercial, and industrial properties. 

The residential buildings include blocks of nineteenth century speculative rowhouses. Residential buildings include notable examples of the Greek Revival, Late Victorian, and Beaux Arts styles.

Notable non-residential buildings include the Church of the Gesú (1879), designed by Edwin Forrest Durang, and Northwestern National Bank (1886).

It was added to the National Register of Historic Places in 1985.

References

National Register of Historic Places in Philadelphia
Historic districts in Philadelphia
Greek Revival houses in Pennsylvania
Beaux-Arts architecture in Pennsylvania
Historic districts on the National Register of Historic Places in Pennsylvania